Armindo Sieb (born 17 February 2003) is a German professional footballer who plays as a forward for 2. Bundesliga club Greuther Fürth.

Club career
Sieb began his youth career at hometown club SG Motor Halle, and later played for the academy of RB Leipzig and 1899 Hoffenheim. In 2020, he joined the Bayern Munich youth team, signing a three-year contract. 

On 15 October 2020, Sieb made his debut for Bayern Munich's senior side during a 3–0 win against fifth-division side 1. FC Düren in the first round of the 2020–21 DFB-Pokal. This was due to the fact that the match, which had been rescheduled from an earlier date, took place immediately following an national team break, resulting in Bayern resting their national team players for the fixture. He was substituted on in the 61st minute for Douglas Costa, but had to come off in the 87th minute for Daniels Ontužāns due to an ankle ligament injury. The appearance made Sieb the third-youngest Bayern player to appear in the DFB-Pokal at the age of 17 years and 241 days, only behind Jamal Musiala (17 years, 232 days; in the starting line-up of the match) and David Alaba (17 years, 231 days). However, the injury left him out until December, but did not require surgery. He made his 3. Liga debut for Bayern Munich II on 13 February 2021, coming on as a substitute for Dimitri Oberlin in the second minute of second-half stoppage time against 1. FC Kaiserslautern. The away match finished as a 1–1 draw for Bayern II. In total, Sieb made 12 appearances in the 3. Liga that season, in which he scored two goals. With the reserves, however, he suffered relegation to the Regionalliga Bayern. As part of the U19 team, Sieb was no longer utilised, also because the season in the youth leagues was discontinued from November 2020 due to the COVID-19 pandemic.

Sieb started the 2021–22 season with the reserves in the Regionalliga. He also appeared for the U19 team in the UEFA Youth League.

On 24 June 2022, Sieb signed a three-year contract until 2025 with 2. Bundesliga club Greuther Fürth, however Bayern Munich secured an exclusive future buy-back option.

International career
Sieb began his youth international career with Germany's under-16 team, making ten appearances and scoring two goals from 2018 to 2019. He made nine appearances and scored six goals for the under-17 team, and appeared twice for the under-18 team.

Career statistics

References

External links
 
 
 
 

2003 births
Living people
Sportspeople from Halle (Saale)
Footballers from Saxony-Anhalt
German footballers
Germany youth international footballers
German people of Mozambican descent
Association football forwards
FC Bayern Munich II players
FC Bayern Munich footballers
SpVgg Greuther Fürth players
3. Liga players